Russell Township is a township in Russell County, Kansas, United States. As of the 2010 United States Census, it had a population of 82.

History
Lincoln Township, including what would later become Grant Township, was organized from part of Russell Township in the 1880s. The city of Russell became independent of Russell Township in the 1940s and has since annexed portions of the township.

Geography
The center of Russell Township is located at  (38.9147336, −98.8450830) at an elevation of 1,844 feet (562 m). The township lies in the Smoky Hills region of the Great Plains. A short segment of the Saline River runs in and out of the far north-central part of the township. Salt Creek, a tributary of the river, flows east then north through the northwest corner of the township. Another Saline tributary, Cedar Creek, runs north then east through the southeastern part of the township. Fossil Creek, a tributary of the Smoky Hill River, runs east-southeast through the southwest corner of the township.

Located in west-central Russell County, it contains no incorporated settlements. Russell Township borders the city of Russell on three sides, to the city's west, north, and east. The township also borders Paradise and Waldo Townships to the north, Center Township to the east, Grant Township to the south, and Big Creek Township to the west.

Demographics

As of the 2010 census, there were 82 people, 39 households, and 27 families residing in the township. The population density was 1.7 people per square mile (0.6/km). There were 46 housing units at an average density of 0.94 per square mile (0.36/km). The racial makeup of the township was 90.2% White, 3.7% African American, and 6.1% Asian. Hispanic or Latino of any race were 0.0% of the population.

There were 39 households, out of which 15.4% had children under the age of 18 living with them, 61.5% were married couples living together, 2.6% had a male householder with no wife present, 5.1% had a female householder with no husband present, and 30.8% were non-families. 28.2% of all households were made up of individuals, and 15.4% had someone living alone who was 65 years of age or older. The average household size was 2.10, and the average family size was 2.48.

In the township, the population was spread out, with 11.0% under the age of 18, 7.1% from 18 to 24, 13.5% from 25 to 44, 46.4% from 45 to 64, and 22.0% who were 65 years of age or older. The median age was 53.5 years. For every 100 females, there were 95.2 males. For every 100 females age 18 and over, there were 108.6 males age 18 and over.

Education
Russell Township lies within unified school district 407, Russell County Schools.

Transportation
U.S. Route 281 runs north–south through Russell Township, connecting to a network of mostly unpaved county roads laid out in a rough grid pattern across the township. The old alignment of U.S. Route 40, now a paved county road, runs east–west through the southwestern part of the township. East of the city of Russell, it re-enters the township as a U.S. 40 business route and then exits to the southeast.

The Kansas Pacific line of the Union Pacific Railroad runs through the township, entering from the west and exiting to the southeast.

References

Townships in Russell County, Kansas
Townships in Kansas